The Trofeo Cappelli e Ferrania (Central Europe Cup) was a winter association football friendly tournament that took place twice, in Rome, Italy, in 1932 and 1934. The tournament organized by the Italian Football Federation, German Football Federation and Swiss Football Association. The competition, parallel to the Mitropa Cup, aimed to compare the best teams of the three countries mentioned, whereas Switzerland and Germany did not offer teams for the Central European Cup. The cup was finally attributed to the formation which had won the title three times or even twice consecutively. The winners of singolre editions would be awarded a trophy at a reduced size.

The tournament was contested by 4 teams, with semifinals, third place match and final. If any match ended in a draw, it was decided by penalties.

Titles
Note that only the winner and runner-up is shown here. Some years there were more than two participating teams.

References

Defunct international club association football competitions in Europe

External links
 Trofeo Cappelli e Ferrania at Rec.Sport.Soccer Statistics Foundation.

1932–33 in European football
1934–35 in European football
1932–33 in Italian football
1934–35 in Italian football
1932–33 in Swiss football
1934–35 in Swiss football
1932–33 in German football
1934–35 in German football